List of Georgetown alumni may refer to:

List of Georgetown University alumni, for alumni of the private, Jesuit, research university in Washington, D.C.
List of Georgetown University Law Center alumni, for alumni of the law school of Georgetown University
Georgetown College#Notable alumni, for alumni of the private, Christian, liberal arts college in Kentucky
List of Georgetown Prep alumni, for alumni of the private, Jesuit, high school for boys in Maryland
Georgetown Visitation Preparatory School#Notable alumnae, for alumnae of the private, Catholic high school for girls in Washington, D.C.
Georgetown Day School#Notable alumni, for alumni of the private, secular K-12 school in Washington, D.C.